Abhay Kumar [Pen Name Abhay K.] (born 1980) is an Indian poet-diplomat and currently serves as the Deputy Director General of Indian Council of Cultural Relations (ICCR), New Delhi. He served as India's 21st Ambassador to Madagascar and Comoros from 2019-2022 He has also served in different diplomatic capacities earlier in Russia, Nepal and Brazil. His published collections of poetry include Stray Poems,Monsoon, The Magic of Madagascar, The Alphabets of Latin America, The Prophecy of Brasilia, The Eight-Eyed Lord of Kathmandu, The Seduction of Delhi among others, while his edited books are CAPITALS, 100 Great Indian Poems, 100 More Great Indian Poems, New Brazilian Poems, The Bloomsbury Anthology of Great Indian Poems, The Bloomsbury Book of Great Indian Love Poems, The Book of Bihari Literature among others. His Earth Anthem has been translated into over 150 languages   and was played at the United Nations to celebrate the 50th anniversary of the Earth Day. He also wrote an anthem for SAARC spurring search for an official SAARC Anthem. He wrote a 'Moon Anthem' to celebrate the success of India's Moon Mission Chandrayaan-2. He has penned anthems on all the planets in the Solar System.

He received the SAARC Literary Award for his contribution to contemporary South Asian Poetry and was nominated for the Pushcart Prize 2013. He has also been honoured with Asia-Pacific Excellence Award in 2014. His The Seduction of Delhi was shortlisted for Muse India-Satish Verma Young Writer Award 2015. He has been called a 'World Poet' by Pulitzer Prize winning poet Vijay Seshadri His translation of Kalidasa's Meghaduta and Ritusamhara received Kalinga Literary Festival 2020-2021 Poetry Book of the Year Award. while The Book of Bihari Literature edited by him received KLF Book Award 2022. He recorded his poems at the Library of Congress. His poem 'The Partitioned Land' was taught at the Cornell University in the Fall 2021.  His book-length poem 'Monsoon' has been chosen by Harvard University's assistant professor Sarah Dimick to study for a book project on Climate and Literature along with the two books of Amitava Ghosh. He was elected as a foreign corresponding member of Brazilian Academy of Letters in 2023.

Early life
Abhay was born and raised near Rajgir in Nalanda district of Bihar. He studied at Delhi University and Jawaharlal Nehru University. He joined the Indian Foreign Service in 2003. He studied Russian language, history and literature at the Moscow State University, U.S. foreign policy at George Washington University and has a Certificate in Poetry Writing from the International Writing Program, University of Iowa. He studied Nepali at Tribhuvan University and a diplomacy module at the Fletcher School of Law and Diplomacy. He speaks Magahi, Hindi, English, Russian, Nepali, Portuguese and knows French and Sanskrit.

Career

Diplomat
He is an Indian Foreign Service officer and has served in various positions at the Ministry of External Affairs (MEA) of the government of India and at the Indian missions and posts abroad in Moscow, St. Petersburg, Kathmandu, Brasilia and Antananarivo. At the MEA headquarters in New Delhi he served as the Under Secretary Digital diplomacy and sent the first tweet after setting up an official Twitter account of the Ministry of External Affairs of India in 2010. He served as the spokesperson of the Embassy of India, Kathmandu from 2012 to 2015. He was appointed Director of the Nehru Centre, London in March 2015 however he could not take up the assignment. Subsequently, he was appointed as India's Deputy High Commissioner to Australia in August 2015 however could not take up the assignment. He served as India's Deputy Chief of Mission to Brazil from 2016-2019 and as India's 21st Ambassador to the Indian Ocean islands of Madagascar and Comoros from 2019-2022. He currently serves as the Deputy Director General of Indian Council of Cultural Relations responsible for cultural events during India's presidency of G-20 from Dec 2022-Nov 2023.
He started Indian Foreign Service Day celebrations on 9 Oct in 2011. He also proposed celebration of the International Day of Diplomats on the United Nations Day which was celebrated in Brasilia for the first time on 24 Oct 2017 with the participation of diplomats from several countries. The second International Day was celebrated in Brasilia while the third one was celebrated in Madagascar. The fourth International Day of Diplomats was celebrated globally. The Embassy of India, Antananarivo became the first Indian Embassy to go solar on 2nd Oct 2020 during his tenure as Ambassador of India to Madagascar   and to have a Street Library.

Writer

Abhay's first book titled River Valley to Silicon Valley(2007) was a memoir that also contained his first poem, 'Soul Song'.  Robert Fay in his piece 'In Search of the Writer-Diplomat tradition' writes- "India continues to maintain this venerable tradition, with poet Abhay Kumar serving in recent years as the Indian Ambassador to Madagascar and Comoros."

Poet

He has published a dozen collections of poetry:

Enigmatic Love (2009)
Love poems from Moscow (Bookwell|2009)
In his first collection of poems written during his stay in Moscow, Abhay K. explores various shades of love and mystery associated with this universal emotion.

 Fallen Leaves of Autumn (2010)
In his second poetry collection Abhay K. turns to nature to seek solace and explores human-nature relationship.

 Candling the Light (2011)
In his third collection of poems written during his stay in Russia, the poet turns philosophical and deals with existential issues faced by humanity.

 Remains(2012)
In his fourth poetry collection the poet engages with various figures of Russia such as Gogol, Pushkin, Dostoevsky among others and life in St.Petersburg.

The Seduction of Delhi (2014)
In his fifth poetry collection written during his stay in Delhi (2010-2012), Abhay K. takes the readers to a poetic ride across the seven cities of Delhi, introduces them to its people, monuments and history. Poet Jayanta Mahapatra, thinks "qualities of love, tenderness and compassion set Abhay K's work apart from much of the general run of current poetics."

The Eight-Eyed Lord of Kathmandu (2017)

The Eight-Eyed Lord of Kathmandu (2017) is a collection on the UNESCO World Heritage sites, festivals, historical personalities, landscapes and prominent places of Nepal written during his stay in Nepal from 2012 to 2015. It was translated into Nepali by Kishore Nepal as Jatra and in Odia by Monalisa Jena as Ashtanetra.

The Prophecy of Brasilia (2018)
In his haiku like short poems, Abhay K. creates a poetic portrait of the Brazil's capital city.

The Alphabets of Latin America(2020)
Pulitzer Prize winning poet Forrest Gander says about The Alphabets of Latin America(2020)-"Abhay K. has a great sense of lineation, of understatement, of memorable, very particular images, and of manuscript structure."

The Magic of Madagascar (2021)
The Magic of Madagascar is a bilingual (Eng-French) collection of haiku written by Abhay K. during his stay in the Indian ocean island of Madagascar (2019-2022) which introduces the reader to the rich and unique flora and fauna of Madagascar and its warm and friendly people and monuments.

 Monsoon (2022)
Monsoon is a poem of 150 stanzas of four lines each written by Abhay K. during his stay in Madagascar which follows the path of monsoon from Madagascar to the Himalayas.

 Stray Poems (2022)
Stray Poems is his 11th collection of poems written between 2010-2020, which contain poems such as The Partitioned Land, Diplomacy, Cosmic Anthems among others.

Celestial (2023)
Celestial is a love poem of 100 stanzas of two rhyming lines each which takes the reader on a poetic ride across all the 88 constellations visible from Earth.

Poems in Poetry Journals and Anthologies
Abhay's poems have appeared in several magazines and literary journals including Poetry Salzburg Review, The Asia Literary Review, Gargoyle, and The Caravan. His poems have also been included in a number of anthologies including A Poem A Day edited by Gulzar (HarperCollins|2020), The Younger Indian Poets edited by Sudeep Sen(Sahitya Akademi|2019), 100 Great Indian Poems (Bloomsbury|2018), and The Himalayan Arc edited by Namita Gokhale (HarperCollins|2018). Abhay has read his poems at major poetry and literature festivals across the globe.Poets from across the world come together to read poems on capital cities Yahoo News, 7 January 2017

In 2022 he appeared on the podcast, The Literary City with Ramjee Chandran, to talk about his career as a poet diplomat.

Editor
CAPITALS
In 2017, CAPITALS, an anthology of poems on the capital cities of the world edited by Abhay K., was released. It brought poets together from across the planet and included contributions from Derek Walcott, Vijay Seshadri, George Szirtes, and Ruth Padel among other prominent poets from 185 countries.

100 Great Indian Poems
100 Great Indian Poems (2018) is an anthology of Indian poetry edited covering over 3000 years of Indian poetry and 28 Indian languages. It has been translated and published into Portuguese, Spanish, Italian,Entrevista com Abhay K .100 Grandes Poemas da Índia Brasilia in Foco, 12 January 2018 Malagasy and Arabic.It has also been translated into French, Russian and Nepali, which will be published soon."A diplomat is taking Indian poetry to the world through translations of a hundred ‘great poems’",Scroll.in, 21 Jan 2018

New Brazilian Poems
This anthology selected, edited and translated by Abhay K. contains the works of 60 contemporary Brazilian poets.

100 More Great Indian Poems
It is a sequel of 100 Great Indian Poems and was published in 2019 by Bloomsbury India.

The Bloomsbury Anthology of Great Indian Poems
It is a collection of 200 Great Indian Poems edited by Abhay K. and published in 2020.

The Bloomsbury Book of Great Indian Love Poems
He has also edited The Bloomsbury Book of Great Indian Love Poems sweeping through three millennia and over two dozen Indian languages.

The Book of Bihari Literature
It is a first anthology of its kind edited by Abhay K. which brings together poems and short stories from ten languages of Bihar spanning over 3000 years into English translation. It was published in October 2022 by HarperCollins India.

Translator
He has translated poems of 60 Brazilian poets from Portuguese and Kālidāsa's Meghadūta and Ritusamhara from Sanskrit.

Lyricist
In 2013 Abhay released Earth Anthem, a song intended as an anthem for the planet Earth, written by him and translated into eight languages including six official UN languages – Arabic, Chinese, French, English, Russian and Spanish – as well as Hindi and Nepali. It was set to music by Sapan Ghimire and sung by Shreya Sotang from Nepal. It has been translated into over 150 languages."Indian diplomat in Nepal pens the Earth Anthem" Indo-Asian News Service, 27 June 2013 On World Environment Day 2017, Abhay K's Earth Anthem composed by L. Subramaniam and sung by Kavita Krishnamurthy was released in Brasilia. A New video of Earth Anthem was released on 22 April 2020 to mark the 50th anniversary of the Earth Day. Over 100 eminent artists from across the world came together to read Earth Anthem to mark 51st anniversary of Earth Day on 22 April 2021. Abhay also wrote an anthem for the South Asian Association for Regional Cooperation (SAARC) in an attempt to foster South Asian consciousness and bring the member states of SAARC together.The Hindu, 4 December 2013 It has spurred discussions on the need for an official SAARC Anthem. He is the first Indian poet invited to record his poems at the Library of Congress.  He wrote Moon Anthem to mark the landing of Chandrayaan 2 on the Moon, which has been composed by Dr. L. Subramaniam and sung by Kavita Krishnamurthy. He has penned anthems on all the planets in the solar system.

Artist

Abhay's art work focus on planetary consciousness. He has exhibited his paintings in St. Petersburg, Paris, New Delhi and Brasilia.Art exhibition "We have come far" by Abhay Kumar opened at RCSC, rusembassy.in, 15 April 2011 Poetry-paintings of Abhay K and Italian artist Tarshito exhibited at the National Academy of Art, New Delhi highlight Delhi's glorious past.

Awards and recognition
2012: 1st Prize by the Amity School of Business, Noida, India for the case study Digital Revolution and Business at the 8th Renvoi, an International Management Case Study Competition
2012: Nominated for the Pushcart Prize
2013: SAARC Literary Award"Five writers honoured at the SAARC Literature Festival" , PTI, 11 March 2013 - Foundation of SAARC Writers and Literature
2014: Asia-Pacific Excellence AwardAsia-Pacific Excellence Award to Indian poet-diplomat Abhay K, ANI, 14 October 2014
2015 : Shortlisted for Muse India-Satish Verma Young Writer Award 2015. 
2017: Called 'World Poet' by Pulitzer Prize winning poet Vijay Seshadri
2022: Kalinga Literature Festival Award for the Best Poetry Book of the Year 2021 for the translation of Kalidasa's Meghaduta and Ritusamhara from Sanskrit
2022: Elected an Associate Foreign Corresponding Member of Malagasy Academy
2023: KLF Book Award 2022 for The Book of Bihari Literature 
2023: Elected a Foreign Corresponding Member of the Brazilian Academy of Letters, Brasilia

Literary Works

Poetry BooksEnigmatic Love : Love poems from Moscow (Bookwell|2009) Fallen Leaves of Autumn (ArtXpress|2010)Candling the Light(Yash|2011)Remains (HarAnand|2012)The Seduction of Delhi(Bloomsbury|2014)The Eight-eyed Lord of Kathmandu (Bloomsbury India |2018) & (The Onslaught Press, Oxford & Paris|2017)The Prophecy of Brasilia (Bilingual edition in English and Portuguese| GaNa, Brazil|2018)The Alphabets of Latin America: A Carnival of Poems (Bloomsbury India |2020)Book Review: The Alphabets of Latin America Financial Express, 28 August 2021The Magic of Madagascar (Bilingual edition in French and English|L'Harmattan, Paris|2021) Book Review : The Magic of Madagascar Financial Express, 07 September 2021Monsoon (Sahitya Akademi, India, 2022)Stray Poems (Poetrywala, India, 2022)Celestial (Mapin, 2023)

Translated
 Uttering Her Name by Gabriel Rosenstock (Salmon Ireland) into Hindi|2015
 Meghaduta by Kalidasa into English (Bloomsbury|2021) 
 Ritusamhara by Kalidasa into English (Bloomsbury|2021)

Edited
Anthology of Contemporary Indian English Poetry (Enchanting Verses Literary Review|2016)
CAPITALS (Bloomsbury|2017)
100 Great Indian Poems (Bloomsbury|2017)
 100 More Great Indian Poems (Bloomsbury India|2019)
The Bloomsbury Anthology of Great Indian Poems (Bloomsbury India|2020)
New Brazilian Poems (Ibis Libris|2019)
 The Bloomsbury Book of Great Indian Love Poems (Bloomsbury|2020)
 The Book of Bihari Literature (HarperCollins|2022)

Non-fictionRiver Valley to Silicon Valley (Bookwell|2007), republished as Becoming A Civil Servant (Kalinjar|2015)10 Questions of the Soul (2010)Colours of Soul (Cvet Dushi) (2011)

Research Work on Poetry of Abhay K.
A PhD on "Cultural Construct of Self: A Critical Study of Abhay Kumar's Poetry" was awarded by Maharaja Ganga Singh University, Bikaner, Rajasthan, India to Amit Dhawan in 2017.Indian Varsity awards PhD on poet's poetry ANI 31 July 2018 Academician Sapna Dogra has written a research paper comparing 'A River'of A.K. Ramanujan and 'Yamuna' of Abhay K.
 Approaching Abhay K.'s The Seduction of Delhi: A Study of Major Themes
 A.K. Ramanujan's 'A River' and Abhay K's 'Yamuna': River as a Symbol of Endless Flow of Meanings 

Quotes
"Whatever be our individual, social or other interests, we should not forget that we have only one cosmic home, Earth."-Abhay K.
"We are humans, Earth is our home." - Abhay K.
"I was never born, I didn't die."- Abhay K.
"United we stand as flora and fauna, united we stand as species of one Earth."- Abhay K.
"There is no greater joy in life than the joy of creating something."- Abhay K.
"Poetry is an intrinsic need of our species."- Abhay K.
"All the people and all the nations, one for all and all for one." -Abhay K.

See also

Indian English Poetry
List of Indian poets in English
Indian Foreign Service
Poet-diplomat

References

External links
Abhay K.'s interview to The Diplomat, Asia Pacific
Abhay K.'s recording of his poems at the Library of Congress in Washington D.C.
 A diplomat is taking Indian poetry to the world through translations of a hundred ‘ great poems’ Scroll.in
In search of the Writer-Diplomat tradition RobertFay.com
 How an Indian diplomat created an anthology of poetry on the world's capitals Scroll.in
 The Sage Indian of Brasilia: Chandrahas Choudhury profiles Abhay K. Mint Lounge
 A Journey of thoughts with Abhay K on India's National Channel DD National Poetry reading at Jaipur Literature Festival 2015 Poetry 24x7 Start at 9 MinJaipur Literature Festival Of poetry and passports, The Hindu''

Indian diplomats
English-language poets from India
Kirori Mal College alumni
Delhi University alumni
Jawaharlal Nehru University alumni
Indian civil servants
Living people
Poets from Bihar
Indian Foreign Service officers
International Writing Program alumni
Indian male poets
Indian
21st-century Indian poets
Ambassadors
Poet-diplomats
1980 births